Aleiphaquilon is a genus of beetles in the family Cerambycidae, containing the following species:

 Aleiphaquilon castaneum (Gounelle, 1911)
 Aleiphaquilon eburneum Mermudes & Monné, 1999
 Aleiphaquilon myrmex Napp & Martins, 1984
 Aleiphaquilon plaumanni Martins, 1975
 Aleiphaquilon rugosum Martins & Galileo, 1994
 Aleiphaquilon taeniatum Mermudes & Monné, 1999
 Aleiphaquilon tasyba Galileo & Martins, 2009
 Aleiphaquilon tricolor Martins, 1975
 Aleiphaquilon una Mermudes & Monné, 1999

References

Callidiopini